Ladies vs Gentlemen is an Indian opinion based poll game show hosted by Bollywood actors Riteish Deshmukh and Genelia Deshmukh. It was originally launched on November 18, 2020. It is an original series of Flipkart Video that stands men and women against each other to guess the opinion of India. The first season concluded with 30 episodes and had featured celebrity guests Rashami Desai, Karan Wahi, Karan Kundra, Bani Judge, Rithvik Dhanjani, Nia Sharma, Paras Chhabra, and Tejasswi Prakash. The second season of the show was recently premiered on October 16, 2021 on the Flipkart app.

Overview 
Ladies vs Gentlemen is a daily poll-based show, where opinion makers wrestle out some of the most debated questions about Men vs Women. The show is hosted by Riteish Deshmukh alongside Genelia D'Souza and joined by the opinion-makers/panelists. In every episode, the contestants are asked a Poll Question and asked to provide a whole percentage number that most closely approximates the exact survey poll answer for the question. Riteish and Genelia then reveal the answers submitted by the contestants and the debate begins. If the contestant guesses the correct answer in accordance with the collective opinion of India, they get awarded at the end of each episode.

Season 1

Hosts 
 Riteish Deshmukh 
 Genelia Deshmukh

Panelists 
 Tejasswi Prakash
 Karan Kundrra
 Rashami Desai
 Paras Chhabra 
 VJ Bani 
 Karan Wahi 
 Vikas Gupta 
 Rithvik Dhanjani 
 Nia Sharma

Season 2 
 Jay Bhanushali
 Vishal Aditya Singh
 Prince Narula
 Kamya Punjabi
 Nia Sharma
 Devoleena Bhattacharjee
 Jasmin Bhasin
 Karan Kundra
 Karishma Tanna
 Terence Lewis
 Asha Negi

Production 
The official teaser of Ladies vs Gentlemen was released on November 6, 2020, on the official YouTube of Flipkart and following which, the official promo was launched featuring Riteish, Genelia, Karan Kundra, VJ Bani, Rithvik Dhanjani, Karan Wahi, Paras Chhabra, Tejasswi Prakash, Nia Sharma, and Rashami Desai.

References

External links 
 

2020 web series debuts
Hindi-language web series
Indian game shows
Quiz shows
Interactive films
2020 Indian television series debuts
Indian television series based on non-Indian television series
Celebrity competitions
Flipkart
Indian reality television series